The first USS Meteor retained her commercial name when the United States Navy purchased her for the "Stone Fleet." She was sunk as an obstruction in Charleston Harbor off Charleston, South Carolina, in January 1862.

Meteor, a full‑rigged sailing ship, was built in Newburyport, Massachusetts, in 1819. From 1822 to 1825, she was one of the ships of the New York-to-Liverpool Red Star Packet Line. In 1830 she became a whaler, her role until 1856. Purchased by the U.S. Navy at Mystic, Connecticut, on 4 November 1861, she was sunk on 9 January 1862 as part of the "Stone Fleet" to help obstruct blockade‑running commerce along the coasts of North Carolina, South Carolina, and Georgia.

References

 

1819 ships
Ships built in Newburyport, Massachusetts
Whaling ships
Full-rigged ships
Ships of the Stone Fleet
Ships of the Union Navy
Maritime incidents in January 1862
Scuttled vessels
Shipwrecks of the American Civil War
Shipwrecks of the Carolina coast